The Third Portuguese India Armada was assembled in 1501 upon the order of King Manuel I of Portugal and placed under the command of João da Nova. It was small compared to other armadas of the same type and was formed for commercial purposes. Nonetheless, it engaged in the first significant Portuguese naval battle in the Indian Ocean. The Third Armada discovered the uninhabited islands of Ascension and Saint Helena in the South Atlantic Ocean. Some speculate that it was the first Portuguese armada to reach Ceylon (now Sri Lanka).

Fleet 

Little is known about the Third Armada of 1501 as opposed to other early Portuguese India armadas. Chroniclers' accounts are scant on details and differ significantly at several points. Very few contemporary documents offer substantive information, such as reconciliations of differing accounts or missing details.

The Third Armada was primarily a commercial run to India. It is confirmed to have been composed of four ships: two owned by the crown and two privately owned. There may have been a fifth supply ship.

This list of captains is given in João de Barros's Décadas,  Damião de Góis's Chronica, Fernão Lopes de Castanheda's História, Diogo do Couto's list, Manuel de Faria e Sousa's Asia  and Quintella's Annaes. Fernão Pacheco replaces Barbosa in several lists: Gaspar Correia's Lendas and the Relação das Naus. The Livro de Lisuarte de Abreu replaces Novais and Barbosa with Rui de Abreu and Duarte Pacheco, respectively.

The modest armada carried 350–400 men, only 80 of which were armed. Its admiral was João da Nova, a Galician-born minor noble. He was Alcalde Pequeno (municipal magistrate) of Lisbon, and his principal recommendation to the admiralship was probably his connection to the powerful Portuguese nobleman Tristão da Cunha.

The owners of the two private ships, D. Álvaro of Braganza and Bartolomeo Marchionni, a Florentine, had jointly outfitted the Anunciada, one of the ships of the Second India Armada of Pedro Álvares Cabral that was still at sea at the time. It was a considerable gamble for them to outfit the new ships before knowing the results of the previous enterprise. The Anunciada safely returned to Lisbon later in 1501 with a large cargo of spices.

One of the passengers on the fleet was Paio Rodrigues, employed by D. Álvaro of Braganza to remain in India as a factor for the private consortium. Another was Álvaro de Braga, a crown factor who was heading for the African port of Sofala.

Mission 

The objective of the Third Armada was wholly commercial. Its mission was to go to India, load up with spices, and return home. The journey was expected to be uneventful.

The journey's destination was Calicut (known as Calecute in some sources, now Kozhikode), the principal spice hub in the state of Kerala and the dominant city-state on the Malabar coast of India. The Third Armada expected – or hoped – that the well-equipped Second India Armada of Pedro Álvares Cabral, which had departed in the previous year (1500), had succeeded in its ambassadorial mission to secure a treaty with Calicut and set up a factory (feitoria, a trading hub) there. The armada was unaware that Cabral's Second Armada had not only failed in its mission, but it also began hostilities between Portugal and Calicut. João da Nova's Third Armada was sailing into a war that it did not expect and for which it was not equipped.

The Third Armada also seems to have had a planned intermediary destination at Sofala, where Cabral had been instructed to set up a factory. According to Correia, the crown ship of Francisco de Novais was designated to trade for gold in Sofala and leave the factor Álvaro de Braga, the clerk Diogo Barbosa (same name as captain) and an additional twenty-two men. Cabral's Second Armada had also already failed that mission: there was no Portuguese factory in Sofala.

The armada could not have delayed its departure until the arrival of the news of the Second Armada. The seasonal monsoon wind patterns of the Indian Ocean forced India-bound expeditions to leave Lisbon by April at the latest in order to find favorable southeasterly summer winds from Africa to India. Those same wind patterns determined that returning fleets could only arrive in Europe in the summer, June at the earliest. Although the difference between one fleet's departure and another fleet's arrival was only a few months, outbound fleets could not delay their departure until the previous year's fleet returned; if they did, an entire year would be lost. Therefore, both the crown and the private consortiums were willing to equip and launch the Third Armada in March 1501 before they received any news of the outcome of the Second Armada. The first ship of the Second Armada to arrive only did so in late June.

Nova's Third Armada would learn of the Second Armada's voyage along its own voyage from notes and letters left by Cabral's ships at African staging posts. Even if the Third Armada learned about the misfortune of the Second Armada, the aforementioned conditions meant that it could not go home to acquire reinforcements or otherwise change the circumstances of its journey. Lightly armed, it would have to press on, sneak into India stealthily, avoid Calicut, load spices at friendly ports, and leave, all as quickly as possible.

Outward voyage 

The armada left in the spring of 1501. Sources vary as to whether it left on March 5 or April 10; Duarte Leite's analysis claims that the earlier date is more likely.

According to chroniclers, the first major events happened in May. Correia states that the Third Armada followed the instructions given by Gaspar de Lemos or André Gonçalves (the captain of a ship that returned from Brazil the previous year). It went southwest and made a brief watering stop at Cape St. Augustine in northeast Brazil, before heading towards southern Africa. All other chroniclers do not mention the Brazilian stop. Barros and Góis mention the discovery of Ascension Island in the same month, an event that Correia himself does not record. Proceeding in the South Atlantic, Nova sighted Ascension Island, which he named Ilha da Conceição ("Conception Island"). The island is confirmed to have been discovered later by Afonso de Albuquerque, who gave it its modern name (ilha da Ascensção) in 1503.

The fleet crossed the Cape of Good Hope on July 7, 1501 without a known incident. It anchored at Mossel Bay (Aguada de São Brás). There, Nova found a note in a shoe by a watering hole. The note was left about a month earlier by Pêro de Ataíde, one of the captains of the returning Second Armada. Ataíde's note, addressed to all captains bound for India, warned that Calicut had become hostile to the Portuguese, but that Cochin (Cochim, now Kochi) and Cannanore (now Kannur) were still friendly ports where spices could be procured. It also recommended India-bound captains to go to Malindi, where Pedro Álvares Cabral left letters that contained more detailed information.  Centuries later, the South African government declared the milkwood tree where Ataíde hung his shoe a national monument and erected a shoe-shaped postbox below it.

In the middle of July 1501, the Third Armada arrived at Mozambique Island. Disregarding instructions, Nova decided against dispatching Novais's ship to Sofala. Nova probably concluded that he needed to take all of his men due to the threat of a military engagement in India. Soon after, he set sail up the East African coast. At the same time, Nova possibly discovered Juan de Nova Island in the Mozambique Channel and the Farquhar atoll, part of the Seychelles, which were named the "João da Nova islands" until the 19th century.

Around the same time, the armada arrived at the Swahili citadel of Kilwa (Quiloa). A Portuguese degredado (convict exile), António Fernandes, greeted them on the beach or on a rowboat. According to Barros and Góis, he was António Fernandes, who carried letters from Cabral; Correia writes that he was Pêro Esteves, who was carrying no letters. The degredado informed Nova of the state of affairs in Kilwa. Barros suggests that, on this occasion, João da Nova personally met Muhammad Arcone, a Kilwan noble who would later play a critical role in Portuguese–Kilwan affairs. Correia notes that Nova was wary of approaching Kilwa, and refused to go ashore despite repeated invitations; he had the degredado negotiate the provision of some supplies, probably citrus fruit, from the city for his scurvy-sick crews and hurriedly moved on.

Barros suggests that in late July, the Third Armada immediately set sail for India after it left Kilwa. Correia claims that Nova sailed first to Malindi to deliver a letter from King Manuel I of Portugal to the Sultan of Malindi. According to Correia, the sultan received the Portuguese well, supplying them amply with biscuits, rice, butter, chickens, sheep and other foods. He further writes that it was now that Nova received the letters that Cabral had dispatched by a messenger from Mozambique, from which he learned more about the Zamorin (monarch) of Calicut, the Portuguese factory at Cochin and the friendly relations with Cannanore and Quilon. In this version, the Third Armada left Malindi on July 28, 1501, and crossed the Indian Ocean after 18 days.

Nova in India 

In August 1501, João da Nova's Third Armada arrived in India at the Santa Maria islands off the Malabar coast. According to Correia, Nova named the islands because of the feast of the Assumption of Mary (August 15).

Narratives about the ensuing events differ. Barros says that Nova immediately began going down the Indian coast to Kerala, but Correia claims that he stopped by the port of Batecala (now Bhatkal), which was the principal trade port of the Vijayanagara Empire, and lingered there, engaging in trade with merchants in the harbors, and chasing pirates in Onor (now Honnavar). Both narratives agree that the Third Armada eventually began going down the Indian coast to Kerala, attempting to capture two merchant ships, allegedly from Calicut, near Mount d'Eli (now Ezhimala Hill) along the way.

The two-month delay between the Third Armada's reputed arrival in India (August) and its first recorded activities in India (November) has been subject to speculation. Correia suggests that the Third Armada simply lingered in the area between Batecala and Mount d'Eli to trade and perhaps engage in piracy before it headed south to Cannanore. Others hypothesize that during this interlude, Nova launched exploratory ventures far to the south below Cape Comorin to locate the fabled island of Taprobana (Ceylon), the world's main source of cinnamon.

The Third Armada arrived in Cannanore in November. They were well received by the Kolathiri Raja of Cannanore, who immediately urged João da Nova to load his ships with spices from the city's markets. Nova rejected the offer because he first had to collect the supplies already acquired by the Portuguese factory in Cochin. Before leaving, Nova left a few agents with instructions to purchase spices, principally ginger and cinnamon, in Cannanore to be loaded later.

Some sources note that Nova established the Portuguese factory in Cannanore at this point. However, the factor whom he left behind was Paio Rodrigues, a private agent of D. Álvaro of Braganza and the Marchionni consortium, not an employee of the Casa da India, the crown trading house. The Casa itself, a proxy of the Portuguese Crown, would only install a factor in Cannanore with the Fourth Armada.

While he was in Cannanore, João da Nova received an embassy from the Zamorin of Calicut. Accompanying the embassy was Gonçalo Peixoto, a Portuguese survivor of the previous year's massacre who had remained in Calicut for the past year. In a letter to Nova, the Zamorin expressed sadness at the Calicut Massacre of December 1500, blaming it on hatred between Muslims and Christians that he never understood. He claimed that he, as a Hindu prince, only had a desire for friendship and peace with Portugal. The Zamorin also reported that the ringleaders of the riot had been rounded up and punished, and invited Nova to Calicut to collect the wares left behind in the Portuguese factory and receive compensation. Proposing to dispatch two ambassadors with Nova's fleet back to Lisbon, he expressed a desire to make a final treaty with King Manuel I of Portugal. The Kolathiri Raja of Cannanore recommended Nova to accept the offer. Gonçalo Peixoto warned Nova to reject the offer, claiming that the Zamorin was luring him into a trap and at the time preparing a war fleet in Calicut. Nova did not reply to the Zamorin's entreaty. Peixoto joined Nova's fleet.

Correia asserts that Peixoto did not come; Nova agreed to the offer from the Zamorin's emissary to Cannanore and sailed to Calicut. The Third Armada anchored by the harbor there, waiting for the promised wares to be shipped from shore, when an unnamed Christian came aboard and warns him about the Zamorin's intentions. Before Nova left, he captured three merchant ships, including one owned by the Zamorin himself, at the mouth of Calicut harbor. He seized their cargoes and burned the vessels in plain view of the city. Valuable loot from the ships included silver Indian nautical instruments, and navigational charts.

Arriving in Cochin, João da Nova encountered a factor left by Cabral, Gonçalo Gil Barbosa, who reports trading difficulties in the local markets. Indian spice merchants required payment in silver, but Cabral had left the factor only with Portuguese goods, mainly cloth. He was expected to use the trading revenue from the sale of the Portuguese goods to buy spices. However, the Portuguese wares had little value in Indian markets, so Barbosa still had his unsold stock and was unable to obtain silver to buy spices. The factor suspected that Arab merchant guilds had engineered a boycott of Portuguese goods in India. He also reported that the Trimumpara Raja of Cochin, despite his alliance and protection of the factory, was furious at the Portuguese because Cabral's Second Armada had departed too suddenly, not taking two noble Cochinese noble hostages with it.

Sources ascribe the lack of silver cash as the pressing problem that Nova did not anticipate. He did not bring much because he expected to raise cash through selling Portuguese goods.
    
Nova immediately set sail back to Cannanore to see if the agents whom he left there had raised cash, but they faced the same problem. The Kolathiri Raja of Cannanore finally intervened, placing himself as security for the sale of spices to the Portuguese on credit and allowing the Portuguese to obtain spices.

Discovery of Ceylon 

In 1898, excavations underneath the Breakwater Office in Colombo, Sri Lanka, revealed a boulder with a Portuguese inscription, a coat of arms, and the clearly denoted date 1501. That was four years before Lourenço de Almeida's arrival on the island, the formal date (1505) of the Portuguese discovery of Ceylon. 

Much speculation has surrounded the inscription. The earliest theory was that the boulder was an uncompleted gravestone for a Portuguese captain born in 1501 (death date missing). However, the arms and style of the inscription appeared to be of a padrão, the typical marker of a Portuguese claim.  Some argue that the date is simply a mistake or that the "1" in 1501 is a poorly carved digit. Another theory is that what appears to be a number is actually an acronym, ISOI (Iesus Salvator Orientalium Indicorum – "Jesus the Savior of the East Indies"). Nonetheless, some historians, notably Bouchon in 1980, have argued that the inscription was made by a captain of the Third Armada of 1501. The sources that describe the journey of the armada do not record that it stumbled upon Ceylon, but the journey of the armada was poorly recorded as a whole.

Bouchon (1980) speculates that the discovery happened during an exploratory venture launched from Anjediva Island or the Santa Maria islands. Another theory that he suggests (p. 257) is that the journey to Ceylon was sometime in late November or early December 1501. Under this scenario, Nova did not immediately return to Cannanore after he realized the cash problem, but rather he or one of his captains either stumbled upon Ceylon or was guided there by a local, hoping for better success there.

None of these theories are confirmed or suggested in any written accounts.

First Battle of Cannanore 

In mid-December 1501, the Third Armada was preparing to leave India, loaded with spices from Cannanore and other goods from piratical attacks. News arrived, however, that a battle fleet led by the Zamorin was approaching. 

Sometime in December, Nova's fleet was cornered by the Zamorin's fleet as he was about to leave Cannanore. The Zamorin's fleet comprised nearly 40 large ships, and 180 small ships called paraus and zambuks. He commanded an estimated 7,000 men.

The Raja of Cannanore urged Nova to stay under his protection and avoid conflict. Nova rejected the Raja's offer, attempting to break out with a favorable breeze. The Third Armada fired its cannons to breach the Zamorin's line. Once a breach was opened, four Portuguese ships charged into the breach in a column formation, their side cannons blasting.
The pounding from the cannons and the height of Nova's ships prevented the Calicut forces from boarding the Portuguese ships with grappling hooks. The less seaworthy fleet of the Zamorin, pursuing the escaping Portuguese, began to splinter due to intense cannon fire. The increased distance between the slowed-down Calicut fleet and the Third Armada caused the former to stop aiming to board the Portuguese ships, causing the battle to become a ranged artillery duel. The Calicut fleet retreated after it realized that its cannons' range and reloading speed could not match those of the Third Armada. Nova gave a brief chase, finally breaking up the engagement on January 2, 1502.

After two days of fighting, the Third Armada had sunk five large ships and about a dozen oar-driven boats. It inflicted great damage on the remaining vessels of the Zamorin while it was not damaged much itself.

Although João da Nova was not prepared for a fight, the two-day naval battle off Cannanore is regarded by some as the first significant Portuguese naval engagement in the Indian Ocean. It was not the first clash between Portuguese and Indian ships – Vasco da Gama's First Armada and Cabral's Second Armada also fought with various Indian fleets. Earlier encounters were fought against mostly poorly armed merchant ships, pirates and isolated squads; a single well-armed caravel could win a battle against these targets with ease. In the First Battle of Cannanore, the Zamorin of Calicut had attacked directly, deploying the best fleet he could against a small group of  Portuguese merchant carracks, which were significantly less heavily armed than the ships of Gama and Cabral. 

According to the Portuguese Navy's official website, the battle is also historically notable for being one of the earliest recorded deliberate uses of a naval column, later called line of battle, and for being resolved by cannon fire alone. The tactics used in the battle became increasingly prevalent as naval technology and strategy evolved, causing the battle to have been called the first modern naval battle.

Return voyage 

In early 1502, the Third Armada captured another Calicut merchant ship near Mount d'Eli, which it sacked, burned and sunk. It began the return voyage soon afterwards. The armada made two watering stops in East Africa: first at Malindi, where Nova deposited letters that would be received later that year by Thomé Lopes, and second at Mozambique Island.

After turning around the Cape of Good Hope, Nova sailed into the South Atlantic and discovered the uninhabited island of Saint Helena while he was returning home. It is believed that the island was named after St. Helen. By tradition the date is the feast day of the saint on May 21. Jan Huyghen van Linschoten in a 2015 paper says that the date is a mistakenly quoted Protestant feast day for a discovery made two decades before the Reformation, instead suggesting May 3 as the more likely date, the feast day of the True Cross. According to legend, Nova anchored on the western side of the island and built a timber chapel at the location of the future Jamestown, Saint Helena. The island became a routine staging post on future Portuguese expeditions to India, but its existence and location was a Portuguese secret for the next eighty years until English captain Thomas Cavendish stumbled upon it in 1588.

Nova's Third Armada arrived in Lisbon on September 11, 1502. According to the letters by Italian merchants in Lisbon, the Third Armada brought back 900 cantari (quintals) of black pepper, 550 of cinnamon, 30 of ginger, 25 of lac, and other assorted goods. The amount of cinnamon has been cited as evidence of the theory that the armada visited Ceylon, but cinnamon was not rare in other Indian markets. Some of the cinnamon may have come from the cargoes of seized vessels.

Aftermath 

The expedition of the Third Armada was not considered a resounding success. Although there was no significant loss of ships or men, the armada came back with fewer spices than what was anticipated; letters insinuate that the cargo holds were partially empty. Nova also failed to trade for gold in Africa. The report of the cash constraint in India and the armada's reliance on piracy to fill its holds disheartened Portuguese merchants, who had previously thought that they could make easy profits on both legs of the India run. In contrast, the discovery of Ascension Island and Saint Helena was well received. The armada arrived too late to supply information from the journey to Gama's heavily armed 4th India Armada, which had already left Lisbon.

Revision of island discoveries 

There are doubts regarding the Third Armada's discovery of Ascension Island and Saint Helena. It is customary to credit João da Nova's Third Armada for discovering Ascension Island, albeit it named the island "Conception Island", on its outward journey in May 1501 and Saint Helena on his return journey on May 21, 1502. The main accounts that have led to this widespread belief are from Barros and Góis. Barros and Góis later suggest that Ascension island was re-discovered twice. Gama's returning Fourth Armada re-discovered it when it was returning to Lisbon in the spring of 1503; eyewitness Thomé Lopes gives the date as July 30, 1503. Afonso de Albuquerque's outgoing Fifth Armada discovered the island on May 20, 1503 and renamed it ilha da Ascensção. 

Nevertheless, modern historians have found anomalies with the conventional account, suggesting that Barros and Góis were mistaken and offering alternative accounts of the discovery of the two islands.

In the Catholic liturgical calendar, the Feast of Conception is on December 8, while the Feast of the Ascension would be in May 1501. Historians contend that the latter fits the timing of the Armada's discovery better, so Nova would be unlikely to name it "Conception Island" rather than "Ascension".

Furthermore, the Cantino planisphere, composed in late 1502 (after Nova returned, but before Albuquerque left), denotes an ilha achada e chamada ascenssam ("island found and called Ascension") but not St. Helena. However, Thomé Lopes, an eyewitness to the return of the 4th Armada, noted that Saint Helena was an "unknown island", and gave its position as 200 leagues away from "Ascension Island" – not "Conception". The 4th Armada had already left Portugal when Nova returned.

Because of these two anomalies, Leite concludes that Nova discovered and named Ascension Island on the outgoing voyage on May 20, 1501 but did not discover St. Helena on the return voyage.

Roukema disagrees with Leite. He cites that it would have been nautically bizarre for Nova, on his outgoing journey, to sail from Cape St. Augustine in Brazil to Ascension Island directly against the winds and currents. The usual route to the Cape of Good Hope was to follow an ocean current known as the South Atlantic Gyre, whose path additionally had favorable winds. Roukema proposes that Nova did discover Ascension island on his return voyage on May 5, 1502 (Ascension Day). However, only Correia suggests that Nova stopped in Brazil, so Roukema's theory rests on conflicting chronicles. Nonetheless, Roukema agrees with Barros and Góis in that Nova discovered some island on his outgoing journey, conjecturing that he actually discovered the Tristan da Cunha island group in the South Atlantic. 
The Cantino planisphere depicts the so-called Ascension Island as multiple islands. Additionally, the one-day difference between Ascension Day (May 20) and St. Helen's Day (May 21) may be the source of confusion of the names. Thus Roukema asserts that Nova discovered and reported the Tristan da Cunha group on the outgoing voyage on May 21, 1501, calling it "Saint Helena", and Ascension island on the return voyage on May 5, 1502, calling it "Ascension Island". However, because of the dates, the two islands were conflated, and the inconsistently used name "Saint Helena" misled Barros and Góis.

Nova was in India in December, and there is no reconciliation of the timing with the liturgical calendar; therefore, Livermore contends that the identification "Conception Island" was a mistake. He also notes that Thomé Lopes could not have known the name "Ascension Island" in July 1503 because his ship left Lisbon before Nova returned. A possible resolution to the latter issue, as Lopes writes, is that the Fourth Armada met the outgoing ships of the Fifth Armada near the Cape of Good Hope in July 1503. 

Accepting the theories of Roukema, Livermore, and other similarly thinking historians leaves doubt about the actual discovery of Saint Helena. Many cite the account of Estêvão da Gama, Vasco da Gama's cousin, on the fleet of the Fourth Armada, which was returning in early 1503. 

However, the eyewitness account of Thomé Lopes indicates that he landed on Saint Helena on July 30, 1503. Lopes writes that on St. Helen's day (May 21, 1503), almost all the ships of the Fourth Armada, including Estêvão da Gama's, were stuck on Mozambique Island with severe sailing problems. Vasco de Gama ordered ships to depart in small groups as they were repaired. Lopes departed Mozambique on June 16 with three ships, noting an anonymous Flemish sailor, who also confirms landing on a South Atlantic island on June 30 in an account. Two of the three ships that Lopes describes had gone to India in 1502 as part of a squadron led by Estêvão da Gama, but they returned in 1503 without him. Lopes's account gives no reason for the island to be named "Saint Helena" since the date reported – July 30, 1503 – was not a feast day of St. Helen. The earliest possible feast day was August 18. Lopes does not state the exact date of his departure from the island, but the Fleming reports that they left on August 1. A possibility is that Saint Helena was first discovered by a different ship of the Fourth Armada – not part of the trio that carried Lopes, but another that departed from Mozambique Island earlier in May.

References and notes

Sources 
Chronicles

 João de Barros (1552) Décadas da Ásia: Dos feitos, que os Portuguezes fizeram no descubrimento, e conquista, dos mares, e terras do Oriente., 1777–78 ed. Da Ásia de João de Barros e Diogo do Couto, Lisbon: Régia Officina Typografica. Vol. 1 (Dec I, Lib.1–5),
 Diogo do Couto "De todas as Armadas que os Reys de Portugal mandáram à Índia, até que El-Rey D. Filippe succedeo nestes Reynos", de 1497 a 1581", in J. de Barros and D. de Couto, Décadas da Ásia Dec. X, Pt.1, Bk.1, c.16
 Fernão Lopes de Castanheda (1551–1560) História do descobrimento & conquista da Índia pelos portugueses (1833 edition, Lisbon: Typ. Rollandiana v.1
 Gaspar Correia (c. 1550s) Lendas da Índia, first pub. 1858-64, Lisbon: Academia Real de Sciencias Vol 1.
 Damião de Góis (1566–67) Chrónica do Felicíssimo Rei D. Manuel, da Gloriosa Memoria, Ha qual por mandado do Serenissimo Principe, ho Infante Dom Henrique seu Filho, ho Cardeal de Portugal, do Titulo dos Santos Quatro Coroados, Damiam de Goes collegio & compoz de novo. (As reprinted in 1749, Lisbon: M. Manescal da Costa) Online
 Relação das Náos e Armadas da India com os Sucessos dellas que se puderam Saber, para Noticia e Instrucção dos Curiozos, e Amantes da Historia da India (Codex Add. 20902 of the British Library), [D. António de Ataíde, orig. editor.] Transcribed and reprinted in 1985, by M.H. Maldonado, Biblioteca Geral da Universidade de Coimbra. Online

 Secondary

 Birch, W. de G. (1877) "Introduction" to translation of Afonso de Albuquerque (1557) The Commentaries of the great Afonso Dalboquerque, second viceroy of India, 4 volumes, London: Hakluyt Society
 Dames, M.L. (1918) "Introduction" in An Account Of The Countries Bordering On The Indian Ocean And Their Inhabitants, Vol. 1 (Engl. transl. of Livro de Duarte de Barbosa),  2005 reprint, New Delhi: Asian Education Services.
 Bouchon, G. (1980) "A propos de l'inscription de Colombo (1501): quelques observations sur le premier voyage de João da Nova dans l'Océan Indien", Revista da Universidade de Coimbra, Vol. 28, p. 233-70.  Offprint.
 Danvers, Frederic Charles (1894) The Portuguese in India, being a history of the rise and decline of their eastern empire.  Vol. 1 (1498–1571) London: Allen.
Diffie, B. W., and G. D. Winius (1977) Foundations of the Portuguese empire, 1415–1580, Minneapolis, MN: University of Minnesota Press
 Leite, Duarte (1960) História dos Descobrimentos, Vol. II Lisbon: Edições Cosmos
 Mathew, K.S. (1997) "Indian Naval Encounters with the Portuguese: Strengths and weaknesses", in K.K.N. Kurup, editor, India's Naval Traditions, New Delhi: Northern Book Centre.
 Monteiro, Saturnino (1989) Batalhas e combates da Marinha Portuguesa: 1139–1521 Lisbon: Livraria Sá da Costa
 Quintella, Ignaco da Costa (1839) Annaes da Marinha Portugueza, v.1. Lisbon: Academia Real das Sciencias.
 Radulet, Carmen M. (1985) "Girolamo Sergini e a Importância Económica do Oriente", Revista da Universidade de Coimbra, Vol. 32, p. 67–77. Offprint.
 Report (1899) "Antiquarian Discovery Relating to the Portuguese in Ceylon", Journal of the Ceylon Branch of the Royal Asiatic Society, Vol. 16,  p. 15–29 Online
 Roukema, E. (1963) "Brazil in the Cantino Map", Imago Mundi, Vol. 17, p. 7–26
 Subrahmanyam, S. (1997) The Career and Legend of Vasco da Gama. Cambridge, UK: Cambridge University Press.
 Smallman, D.K. (2003) Quincentenary: A Story of St Helena,1502–2002. Pezance, UK: Patten.

Portuguese India Armadas
Maritime history of Portugal
Portuguese in Kerala
1501 in Portugal
1501 in India
16th century in Portuguese India
1501 in the Portuguese Empire
1501 in Portuguese India